Vittorio Veneto was a helicopter cruiser that served with the Italian Navy. Originally intended to be a class of two ships specifically designed for anti-submarine warfare (ASW), only Vittorio Veneto entered into service in 1969, its sister ship Italia being cancelled. Vittorio Veneto was decommissioned in 2003. This ship has the same general layout as the smaller  helicopter cruisers, but with two elevators in the flight deck and the hangar below, rather than with the hangar as part of the superstructure. It was named for the decisive Battle of Vittorio Veneto which ended World War I on the Italian front.

History
Although the Andrea Doria-class helicopter cruisers proved a useful addition to the fleet, it was judged that a larger ship was necessary. Such a vessel would be able operate a larger airwing and provide helicopter support in bad weather conditions. These considerations led to the Vittorio Veneto class, of which two ships were originally planned, though only one was actually built.  The second ship of the class, Italia, was cancelled.

The ship was laid down on 10 June 1965 and launched on 5 February 1967. The cruiser was completed on 12 July 1969 at the Italcantieri plant of Castellammare di Stabia. It entered in service in the October of the same year, at the naval base of Taranto. Vittorio Veneto remained the flagship of the Italian Navy until the aircraft carrier  was commissioned in 1985.

Design

Vittorio Veneto has a displacement of 7,500 tons standard and 8,850 tons fully loaded. Unlike the Andrea Dorias, which had separate funnels, it has two combination mast/funnels. The second major difference in design is the location of the helicopter facilities. Vittorio Veneto has a raised rear deck to accommodate a hangar beneath the helicopter platform, rather than a frigate/destroyer style hangar in the superstructure. There are two elevators to transfer the helicopters between the hangar and the deck.

Originally the ship carried armament similar to the Andrea Dorias comprising a Terrier anti-aircraft system situated in front of the bridge, which could also be used to launch ASROC antisubmarine rockets. Compared to the Andrea Dorias, Vittorio Venetos missile magazine has a third drum, increasing magazine capacity by a half to sixty rounds. The secondary armament comprised eight dual-purpose  guns in a ring around the superstructure, similar to the Andrea Dorias. Finally, the vessel was armed with two triple 324 mm torpedo launchers. Vittorio Veneto could operate up to nine light helicopters, of the types Agusta-Bell AB-204 or later AB-212 or six heavy helicopters of the type AB-61, which could be housed in the hangar beneath the long rear deck.

The electronics were rather advanced for the time, comprising a three-dimensional AN/SPS-52 B radar and an SPS-768 (RAN 3L) air search radar. For anti-submarine warfare an AN/SQS-23 sonar set was installed.

Like the previous class, the cruiser had a set of stabilizing fins to improve stability for helicopter operations.

Upgrades
The ship underwent an extensive update between 1981 and 1984. The electronics were updated, and launchers for Otomat missiles were installed, together with three OTO Melara twin  DARDO CIWS compact gun mounts for AA defence and Standard SM-1ER SAM missiles to replace the Terrier SAM. The engine feeding system was shifted from nafta to diesel fuel for standardisation and environmental reasons.

Accidents
Vittorio Veneto ran aground in bad weather off the port of Vlorë on 22 April 1997. At the time it was acting as the flagship of a multinational task-force that protected aid deliveries to Albania. It took four tugboats to pull it free. No damage to the ship or injuries to the crew were reported by the Italian navy.

Decommissioning
After 1995 Vittorio Veneto served mainly as a training ship. It was decommissioned in 2003. Its air coverage capability is now supplied by the  V/STOL aircraft carrier .

See also

References

Sources
 Gardiner, Robert; Chumbley, Stephen & Budzbon, Przemysław (1995). Conway's All the World's Fighting Ships 1947-1995. Annapolis, Maryland: Naval Institute Press. .

External links
Vittorio Veneto (550) Marina Militare website
 GlobalSecurity.org

Vittorio Veneto-class cruisers
Cruisers of the Italian Navy
Ships built by Fincantieri
1967 ships
Helicopter carrier classes
Cold War cruisers of Italy
Ships built in Castellammare di Stabia